The British rapper and singer Stefflon Don has made numerous recordings since 2016.

Mixtapes

Extended plays

Singles

As lead artist

As featured artist

Promotional singles

Guest appearances

Notes

References

Discographies of British artists
Hip hop discographies